The AC Frua or AC 428 is a British GT built by AC Cars from 1965 to 1973. Production was 81 cars built in total: 49 coupés (known as fastbacks), 29 convertibles, and 3 special bodied.

History
The Frua is built on an AC Cobra 427 Mark III chassis extended by 6 inches (150 mm). Chassis were built at the AC plant in England then shipped to Frua's workshop in Italy where the body was fitted and then sent back to England to have the power train and trim added. The cost was high and the cars could not be sold at a competitive price. Unlike similar cars such as the Iso Grifo, Iso Rivolta, Monteverdi, and De Tomaso models of the period, the AC Frua features fully independent racing based coil spring suspension.

The AC Frua was never fully developed because AC Cars lacked the financial means. The car's main drawback is a tendency of the V8's heat to bleed into the cabin.

Chassis

Chassis construction was similar to most Italian supercars of that era, with square and rectangular tubing connecting the steel body to the frame. Though the 4-inch (100 mm) tubular chassis allowed both coupé and convertible versions to be rigid, the design was intricate and prone to rust.  The bonnets and boot lids were fabricated from aluminum.

Performance

The AC Frua competed with Ferrari, Lamborghini, and Maserati models. Built over a stretched AC Cobra 427 chassis, the car had immense performance; the big-block Ford FE engine had larger capacity, more torque and more power than similar Italian cars, but in a car of similar weight.

John Mclellan wrote in his book "Classic ACs, Auto Carrier to Cobra" that Derek Hurlock once said to journalist Mike Tailor: "I like the 428 because it fits my image of a true GT Car". He is quoted in Autocar "Like anything exclusive, especially from craftsmen, it costs a lot of money. For this you get one of the fastest cars on the road, guaranteed to make an impression anywhere, and backed by a small company that cares. This one AC that joined that select company of very fast, very luxurious touring automobiles which moved effortlessly from current model to collector's piece". The magazine published a road test report in 1968 of a 428 coupé, and recorded a maximum speed of 141 mph (227 km/h) along with a 0 - 60 mph (97 km/h) time of 6.2 seconds.  The acceleration time was fractionally better than the magazine's testers had achieved with an Aston Martin DB6, but the Aston Martin was comfortably ahead on top speed.   The AC's overall fuel consumption for the test came in at 15.6 mpg (18.1 L/100 km), roughly 15% better than the heavy Aston Martin.  The AC 428 coupé sported a recommended UK retail price of £5,573 (including automatic transmission), to the manual transmission Aston Martin DB6's £4,460 - itself roughly twice that of a 4.2 litre Jaguar E-Type roadster at £2,225.

Towards the end of the production run a couple of prototypes for an extended range were produced. There was a four-door version of the coupe and a more streamlined version of the convertible that included electrically operated "pop-up" headlamps. Neither was developed due to the precarious state of the company finances.

The AC Frua may be confused with the very similar looking Pietro Frua designed Maserati Mistral. However, only the front quarter windows and door handles are shared.

See also
British motor industry

References

External links

AC 428 history
Pietro Frua
Sales brochure of the AC 428 from 1967

Information and reviews for the 1960 AC 428

Sports car manufacturers
Borough of Elmbridge
Frua
Grand tourers
Cars introduced in 1965
1970s cars
Cars discontinued in 1973